Petersburgh United Methodist Church is a historic Methodist church at 12 Head of Lane Road in Petersburgh, Rensselaer County, New York.  It was originally built in 1820 and modified to its present Queen Anne style appearance in 1892. The original meeting house style building measures 48 feet long and 36 feet wide.  In 1892, the 45 feet tall bell tower was added and a more steeply pitched roof was added over the original roof.  An annex was completed in 1938.

It was listed on the National Register of Historic Places in 2004.

References

United Methodist churches in New York (state)
Churches on the National Register of Historic Places in New York (state)
Queen Anne architecture in New York (state)
Churches completed in 1820
19th-century Methodist church buildings in the United States
Churches in Rensselaer County, New York
National Register of Historic Places in Rensselaer County, New York